William Emmett Ryan III was an American broadcast journalist with the NBC television network and its owned-and-operated local station WNBC-TV in New York City for 26 years. He served for a year (1970-1971) as news anchor at WOR-TV. Ryan was also co-anchor of the Ralph & Ryan radio morning show on WMCA in the late 1970s and early 1980s.

Ryan may be best remembered for co-anchoring NBC's coverage of the assassination of U.S. President John F. Kennedy with Chet Huntley and Frank McGee.

References

1926 births
1997 deaths
American television reporters and correspondents
NBC News people
American television news anchors
Place of birth missing
Place of death missing